His (Royal) Apostolic Majesty was a styled title used by the Kings of Hungary, in the sense of being latter-day apostles of Christianity.

First creation
The origin of this title dates from about A.D. 1000 when it was conferred by Pope Silvester II upon Saint Stephen I (975–1038), the first Christian king of Hungary, who is supposed to have received it  in recognition of his promoting the introduction of Christianity into Hungary and his zeal in seeking the conversion of the heathen. According to tradition, Stephen also received the ecclesiastical title of Apostolic Legate.
 
The Habsburg dynasty saw themselves as heirs of Saint Stephen (reigned ca. 997–1038), inheritors of the title which they claimed had been bestowed by Pope Sylvester II.

Arduin or Hartvik (1097–1103), bishop of Győr, the biographer of St. Stephen, recounts that the pope hailed the king as a veritable "Apostle" of Christ, with reference to his holy labours in spreading the Catholic faith through Hungary. However the papal bull of Sylvester II, dated 27 March 1000, though it granted St. Stephen the crown and title of King, returned the kingdom he had offered to the Holy See, bestowed the right to have the cross carried before him, and granted administrative authority over bishoprics and churches, nevertheless made no mention of this particular title.

Second creation
Pope Leo X having conferred the title of Defensor Fidei on Henry VIII of England in 1521, the nobles of Hungary, headed by Stephen Werbőczy, later Palatine of Hungary, negotiated unsuccessfully with the Holy See to confirm the title of "Apostolic Majesty" for King Louis II of Hungary. 
 
In 1627, Emperor Ferdinand III endeavoured to obtain the title, but was discouraged by the Primate of Hungary, Péter Pázmány and the Holy See. Later, when Emperor Leopold I (1657–1705) established supreme royal authority over ecclesiastical jurisdiction and administration, the title "Apostolic Majesty" came into use.
 
Holy Roman Empress Maria Theresia, Queen of Hungary, used the title "Apostolic Queen" for the first time in letters patent to the imperial envoy to the College of Cardinals after the death of Pope Benedict XIV, hoping that the new pontiff would approve the title. Pope Clement XIII acceded, granting this title for the rulers of Hungary in a motu proprio, the Papal Brief "Carissima in Christo filia" of 19 August 1758. An edict of Maria Theresa prescribed the title "Apostolic King of Hungary" for all future official documents.
 
Henceforth the King of Hungary bore this title after his coronation, though it did not extend to the King's spouse (Empress-consort of Austria), nor to his heir, who was crowned rex junior during the King's lifetime.

After the dissolution of the Holy Roman Empire, Franz Joseph I of Austria was titled "His Imperial and Royal Apostolic Majesty" (Seine Kaiserliche und Königlich Apostolische Majestät, Hungarian: Ő császári és apostoli királyi Felsége) along with his consort Empress Elisabeth, who was styled "Her Imperial and Royal Apostolic Majesty" (Ihre Kaiserliche und Königlich Apostolische Majestät). The plural for the couple was also used as "Their Imperial and Royal Apostolic Majesties" (Ihre Kaiserlichen und Königlich Apostolischen Majestäten).

The powers of the crown over the Catholic Church in Hungary were not based upon the title "Apostolic Majesty", but upon the supreme royal right of patronage.

The style has not been used since the abolition of the monarchy in 1918. It was abbreviated to HAM or HRAM; when used with the Austrian Imperial style, it was usually simplified to HI&RM or HIM.

Similar titles
The monarchs of other countries have received similar titles from the pope:
 Venice: Most Serene Republic
 France: Most Christian Majesty (awarded )
 Spain: Most Catholic Majesty (awarded in 1493)
 England: Defender of the Faith (awarded in 1521 and revoked again c. 1530 by the Pope. Granted again in 1543 by the Parliament of England.)
 Germany: Defensor Ecclesiae (Protector of the Church; awarded to Holy Roman Emperors)
 Portugal: Most Faithful Majesty (awarded in 1748)

Sources and references 

Heads of state
 
Royal styles